Beaver Falls High School is a public high school in Beaver Falls, Pennsylvania, United States.  It is the only high school in the Big Beaver Falls Area School District. Athletic teams compete as the Beaver Falls Tigers in the Western Pennsylvania Interscholastic Athletic League.

Extracurriculars
The district offers a wide variety of  after school clubs, activities and sports.

The Tigers' main athletic rivals are the New Brighton Lions, who they play each season in football for the Little Brown Jug, the trophy winner takes it home to their high school, and the Aliquippa quips which are played every season as well.

Athletics
Men's Football
Men's Golf
Men's Cross Country
Men's Basketball - PIAA state champions in 1970, 1994, 2005, 2013 [28]
Men's Baseball
Men's Swimming and Diving
Men's and Women's Track and Field
Men's and Women's Bowling-(started in 2007)
Women's Volleyball
Women's Tennis
Women's Cross Country
Women's Basketball
Women's Softball
Women's Swimming and Diving

Notable alumni
Jake McCandless, class of 1947, football and basketball coach
Jim Mutscheller, American football player
Joe Lonnett, Major League Baseball player & coach
Joe Namath, NFL Hall of Fame quarterback from 1965-1977. 
Candy Young, The national high school record holder in 100 metres hurdles.

References

External links
Official site

Public high schools in Pennsylvania
Schools in Beaver County, Pennsylvania
Education in Pittsburgh area
Beaver Falls, Pennsylvania